Olga Vladimirovna Rocheva (born 4 July 1978 in Krasnoyarsk) is a Russian cross-country skier who has competed since 1999. Competing in two Winter Olympics, she earned her best finish of sixth in the team sprint at Turin in 2006 and had her best individual finish of 14th in the individual sprint event at those same games.

At the FIS Nordic World Ski Championships 2009 in Liberec, Rocheva finished eighth in the 4 × 5 km relay, 11th in the 10 km, and 27th in the 7.5 km + 7.5 km double pursuit events.

Her best individual World Cup finish was third in a 7.5 km + 7.5 km double pursuit event in Canada in 2008 while Rocheva's best World Cup finish second twice, both in 4 × 5 km relays in 2001 and 2006.

Cross-country skiing results
All results are sourced from the International Ski Federation (FIS).

Olympic Games

World Championships

World Cup

Season standings

Individual podiums

1 podium

Team podiums

 5 podiums – (3 , 2 )

References

External links

1978 births
Cross-country skiers at the 2006 Winter Olympics
Cross-country skiers at the 2010 Winter Olympics
Living people
Olympic cross-country skiers of Russia
Sportspeople from Krasnoyarsk
Russian female cross-country skiers